Wonders of the World is the second album from dub band Long Beach Dub Allstars. It was released on September 11, 2001, and was the final album from the band. The band members were: Ras 1 (vocals, guitar); Tim Wu (vocals, flute, saxophone, synthesizer); Jack Maness (vocals, Hammond B-3 organ, keyboards); Opie Ortiz (vocals); Marshall Goodman (drums, percussion, turntables); Eric Wilson (bass); Bud (drums). It was recorded at Total Access Studios, in Redondo Beach, California. "Sunny Hours" was used as the theme song to the Friends''' spin-off sitcom, Joey''.

The record was produced by Paul Leary (who also produced half of Sublime's breakthrough self-titled album) and engineered and mixed by Eddie Ashworth, who also worked on many of Sublime's albums as well co-producing the previous Long Beach Dub All Stars album.

Track listing

Guest Artist
Some of the tracks on this album feature additional artist, including:
 "Sunny Hours" featuring will.i.am (of The Black Eyed Peas) and a sample of Bradley Nowell's voice (of Sublime) taken from "What I Got"
 "Life Goes On" featuring Half-Pint, Ives (of Delinquent Habits), Chali 2na, and Tippa Irie
 "Talkin' the Truth" featuring Paulie Selekta (of The Burn Unit)
 "Lies" featuring I-Man (of Capitol Eye)

2001 albums
Long Beach Dub Allstars albums
DreamWorks Records albums